Heike may refer to:

 Heike (given name), a (not exclusively) feminine given name, derived from the male name Anri (Henry)
 Taira clan, sometimes referred to as "Heike"
 Heike crab, a species of crab named after the Taira (Heike) clan
 Heike Ondo, a Japanese folk song
 Heike Shamisen, a Japanese musical instrument
 The Tale of the Heike, an epic account of clan struggle